Karel Purkyně (15 March 1834, Wrocław – 5 April 1868, Prague) was a painter in the Austro-Hungarian Empire.  He was one of the most prominent proponents of realism in Czech art in the second half of the 19th century.

Biography
He was the son of the physiologist and anatomist Jan Evangelista Purkyně, and developed an interest in art while still young.  Early influences included the Baroque painters Karel Škréta and Petr Brandl and the paintings of the Dutch Golden Age.  He spent a year in Munich studying with Johann Baptist Berdelle (1813-1876) before traveling to Paris, where he worked with Thomas Couture; there he copied paintings by the Old Masters and encountered the work of contemporary French artists.  He was particularly struck by the works of Gustave Courbet.

Upon returning to Prague, Purkyně became known primarily as a portraitist, though a handful of works in other genres are known.  He also made a name for himself as an organizer of artistic events and as an art critic.

Sources
Naděžda Blažíčková-Horová, ed. 19th-Century Art in Bohemia: (1790–1910) - Painting, Sculpture, Decorative Arts.  Prague; National Gallery in Prague, 2009.

Further reading

 František Xaver Jiřík, Karel Purkyně: An Account of the Life and Work of the Artist, with Reproductions and Portraits, J. Štenc, 1925
 Vladimír Novotný, Karel Purkyně, Volume 7 of "Origins", Melantrich 1936
 Jana Krofty, Karel Purkyně, Melantrich, 1942
 Vojtěch Volavka, Karel Purkyně (exhibition catalog), Malá galerie 1962 
 Olga Macková, Karel Purkyně 1834-1868: Souborná výstava díla (a comprehensive exhibition), Národní galerie, 1962

External links

 Karel Purkyně @ abART 
 "Karel Purkyně: Podobizna kováře Jecha" (Portrait of a Blacksmith) a video from Česká televize

1834 births
1868 deaths
Artists from Wrocław
Czech art critics
19th-century Czech painters
Czech male painters
19th-century male writers
Burials at Vyšehrad Cemetery
19th-century Czech male artists